Loughtee Upper, or Upper Loughtee, is a barony in County Cavan, Republic of Ireland. Baronies were mainly cadastral rather than administrative units. They acquired modest local taxation and spending functions in the 19th century before being superseded by the Local Government (Ireland) Act 1898.

Etymology
Loughtee Upper takes its name from the Irish Lucht Tí, Early Modern Irish lucht tighe Még Mathghamhna (Annals of the Four Masters), "people of the household of Mac Mahon"; the land was allocated to the Mic Bhradaigh vassals of the McMahons as mensal land.

Geography

Loughtee Upper is located in the middle of County Cavan, east of the River Erne and Lough Oughter.

History

Loughtee Upper was a centre of power for the Ó Raghallaigh (O'Reillys) Gaelic Irish tribe in the Middle Ages, based first at Lough Oughter and then moving to Tullymongan near to modern Cavan. The MacGobhains (McGowans) served as leader of the gallowglass. A Mic Bradaigh (Brady) family of clerics and freeholders was also here, ruling areas called Cúl Brighde and Teallach Cerbaill, near modern Stradone.

The barony of Loughtee was created by 1609 in the Plantation of Ulster, and was archaically spelled Loughty. Its alluvial soil was recognised as the best in Cavan, and it was originally allocated to the Crown, then later to undertakers.

It was split into Upper and Lower parts in 1821.

List of settlements

Below is a list of settlements in Loughtee Upper:

Ballyhaise
Butlersbridge
Cavan
Stradone

References

Baronies of County Cavan